Wadley is a surname. Notable people with the surname include:

Akrum Wadley (born 1995), American football player
Jock Wadley (1914–1981), English journalist
Louise Wadley, Australian film director
Lyn Wadley, South Africa Archaeology
Marie Wadley (1906–2009), American co-founder
Nicholas Wadley (1935-2017), British art critic
Robert Wadley (1925-2004), American politician
Shangela Laquifa Wadley (born 1980), American drag queen
Trevor Wadley (1920–1981), South African electrical engineer
Veronica Wadley (born 1952), British journalist